World Is Static were an English rock band from County Durham, England, formed in 2005 by lead singer/songwriter Heather Frances and guitarist/songwriter Simon Chester.  Taking their name from a song on the Static Prevails album by Jimmy Eat World, the band play down-tuned melodic tunes.

World Is Static were the first band to be played on the test transmission of UK-based radio station Ne1fm.

The band were also played on the first ever AlterNation show on the same radio station and described as "County Durham's finest gothic rockers".

The song "Dying Inside" was released by Hollywood-based record label 272 Records on the compilation album The Funeral Volume 1 (2007).  It was also included on the Culture Clash (2008) compilation album by the UK-based S.J.H. Entertainment Group.  The song "By Myself" was featured on the Once Upon a Tyne mockumentary horror film Behind the Scenes of Total Hell: The Jamie Gunn Chronicles.

Discography

EPs
2006 - Lobotomy Patient No.1
2007 - Lobotomy Patient No.1 (reissued with extra track)
2008 - Lobotomy Patient No.1½
2009 - World Is Static

Compilation albums 
The Funeral Volume One - 272 Records (2007) - Track: "Dying Inside"
Culture Clash - S.J.H. Entertainment Group (2008) - Track: "Dying Inside"
EDG&R Freshers CD 08-09 - Edgarsoc (2008) - Track: "Not Gonna Stay"

References

External links 
World Is Static official Myspace
World Is Static official Facebook Page

English gothic rock groups
Musical groups from County Durham